The Straight Arrow radio program is a western adventure series for juveniles which was broadcast, mostly twice weekly in the United States from 1948 through 1951. A total of 292 episodes were aired.

Initially broadcast on the Don Lee Network, on February 2, 1949, the program debuted nationally on the Mutual Broadcasting Network. All the programs were written by Sheldon Stark.

The protagonist, rancher Steve Adams, became the Comanche Indian, the Straight Arrow, when bad people or other dangers threatened. In fact, Adams was a Comanche orphan who had been adopted by the Adams ranching family and later inherited the ranch.  His dual identity was known to only one friend, Packy McCloud, Steve Adams's sidekick. Internal evidence places the ranch in the vicinity of the Colorado Rockies in the 1870s. Howard Culver played both Adams and Straight Arrow.

The program was sponsored by Nabisco Shredded Wheat cereal.

A review in the trade publication Variety noted that a distinguishing aspect of the program was its effort "to point up the positive role of the Indian in developing the West."

Comic book and comic strip
Like many other children's programs, this one soon had cross-over presence.  The Straight Arrow comic book, published by Magazine Enterprises, first came out in February 1950, running 55 issues until 1956. Most of the stories were written by Gardner Fox. 

In addition, there were two Straight Arrow comic strips. The first, a daily strip, ran from June 19, 1950 to August 4, 1951. Gardner Fox and Ray Krank wrote the strip, with art by Joe Certa (pencils) and John Belfi (inks). The second, a Sunday strip, ran from September 7 to December 7, 1953. Walter B. Gibson wrote the strip, with art by Fred Meagher.

There were also Straight Arrow collectible cards of Indian crafts inserted in the boxes of Nabisco Shredded Wheat cereal.

In 2019, the rights of the Straight Arrow character including the trademarks were transferred to Education Is Our Buffalo Community Centre, a Canadian based Indigenous organization. Education Is Our Buffalo has an active Indigenous-perspective Facebook group.

Bibliography

References

American children's radio programs
1948 radio programme debuts
1951 radio programme endings
American radio dramas
English-language radio programs
Mutual Broadcasting System programs
American comic strips
1950 comics debuts
1951 comics endings
Radio programs adapted into comics
Comics based on radio series
Western (genre) comics
Fictional archers
Fictional Native American people